Andreas Seelig (born July 6, 1970 in Berlin) is a retired discus thrower from Germany. He won the 1989 European Junior Championships and ended up in seventh place at the 1998 European Championships. Seelig also won the men's discus throw event (63.52 m) at the Military World Games in 1999 (Zagreb).

Achievements

References

1970 births
Living people
German male discus throwers
Athletes from Berlin